{{DISPLAYTITLE:C15H14N2O2}}
The molecular formula C15H14N2O2 may refer to:

 Licarbazepine
 Nepafenac
 Pyrrolidonyl-β-naphthylamide

Molecular formulas